Microbacterium humi is a Gram-positive and rod-shaped bacterium from the genus Microbacterium which has been isolated from the fungus Agaricus blazei in Taiwan.

References

Further reading

External links
Type strain of Microbacterium humi at BacDive -  the Bacterial Diversity Metadatabase	

Bacteria described in 2010
humi